Lofa-2 is an electoral district for the elections to the House of Representatives of Liberia. The constituency covers Vahun District, three communities of Kolahun District (Kamatahun, Popalahun, Lehun) and four communities of Foya District (Foya Tengia, Kpagamai, Yassadu, Kimbaloe).

Elected representatives

References

Electoral districts in Liberia